Pattikkad may refer to several places:
 Pattikkad, Thrissur, a small village in Thrissur district, Kerala, India
 Pattikkad, Perinthalmanna, a small village near Perinthalmanna in Malappuram district, Kerala, India
 Pattikkad railway station